Rutenga,  is an important village in the province of Masvingo Province in Zimbabwe. It is the de facto capital of Mwenezi (District).

There are unverified claims that the name “Rutenga” is derived from corruption by local natives of what the Rhodesian settlers supposedly called “Route Anchor” given its central  position to access South Africa and Mozambique. These claims are unlikely to be true as there are records of usage of the name “Rutenga” before the completion of the Rutenga-Beitbridge railway in 1974. There is also no known historical or modern-day usage of the term “Route Anchor” in Rhodesian or Zimbabwean railway history.

Transports 

It straddles the A4 highway between Beitbridge and Masvingo.

The village has a railway station on the Limpopo railway that connects it to Sango and Zvishavane. The same station serves as a link between the Limpopo railway and the Rutenga-Beitbridge railway.

Economy 

It is an important point of economic and demographic growth for southwest Zimbabwe.

Rutenga is an irrigation enclave that uses water from Manyuchi Dam to irrigate sugar estates.

References

Business Centers in Mwenezi (District)
Populated places in Masvingo Province
Mwenezi (District)